Lake Tiroto is a lake on the island of Atiu in the Cook Islands. According to legend, the eel Rauou dug the lake before travelling to Mitiaro to dig lakes there. The lake is connected to the sea by a tunnel under the makatea.

See also 
 List of lakes in the Cook Islands

References

Lakes of the Cook Islands